Lugongolweni is an inkhundla of Eswatini, located in the Lubombo District.  Its population at the 2007 census was 15,519. It is divided into four umphakatsi, or chiefdoms: Ka-Langa, Makhewu, Mlindazwe, and Sitsatsaweni.

Populated places 
 Lonhlupheko
 Siteki

References

Populated places in Lubombo Region